Juan José "Juanjo" Nieto Zarzoso (born 3 October 1994) is a Spanish footballer who plays for SD Huesca. Mainly a right back, he can also play as a winger.

Football career
Born in Castellón de la Plana, Valencian Community, Nieto represented VV Rafalafena, CD Castellón, CF Futur and CD Roda as a youth. He made his senior debut with Castellón's first team on 16 December 2012, starting in a 1–1 Tercera División home draw against CD Eldense.

On 16 September 2013 Nieto joined Real Valladolid, being assigned to the reserves also in the fourth level. He achieved promotion to Segunda División B in his first season as an undisputed started, but was sparingly used in his second.

On 6 August 2015, Nieto signed for fellow third-tier club CD Atlético Baleares. The following 18 July he moved to another reserve team, RCD Mallorca B.

Nieto first appeared with the main squad on 22 January 2017, starting in a 1–1 Segunda División away draw against CF Reus Deportiu. On 14 July, after suffering relegation, he agreed to a deal with Hércules CF in the third division.

On 6 August 2019, Nieto returned to the second division after agreeing to a two-year deal with Real Oviedo. He scored his first professional goal on 1 December, netting the opener in a 2–1 home win over Rayo Vallecano.

On 9 July 2021, free agent Nieto signed a two-year contract with UD Almería also in the second level. He helped the side in their promotion to La Liga, but suffered a knee injury in February 2022.

On 25 November 2022, after recovering from injury, Nieto announced his departure from the Rojiblancos, and signed a 18-month deal with SD Huesca in the second division.

Honours
Almería
Segunda División: 2021–22

References

External links

1994 births
Living people
Sportspeople from Castellón de la Plana
Spanish footballers
Footballers from the Valencian Community
Association football defenders
Association football wingers
Segunda División players
Segunda División B players
Tercera División players
CD Castellón footballers
Real Valladolid Promesas players
CD Atlético Baleares footballers
RCD Mallorca B players
RCD Mallorca players
Hércules CF players
Real Oviedo players
UD Almería players
SD Huesca footballers